Antipterna tephrodes is a species of moth in the family Oecophoridae, first described by Oswald Bertram Lower in 1902 as Ocystola tephrodes.   The male holotype for Ocystola tephrodes was collected at Stawell in Victoria.

Further reading

References

Oecophorinae
Taxa described in 1902
Taxa named by Oswald Bertram Lower